Curly pine is pine wood with a wavy pattern similar to that of curly maple.

On their website, the wood supplier Blackwood Timber Company says, "Curly pine is the coolest grain pattern that you can possibly expect out of an ancient long leaf pine."

References
Pinaceae
Wood